Tuslaw High School is a public high school located in Tuscarawas Township, Ohio near the city of Massillon and serves all high school students in the Tuslaw Local School district. Tuslaw High School is a member of the Stark County Area Vocational School District allowing its high school students to attend the R.G. Drage Vocational Center located in Massillon.

The school's mascot is the Mustang and the school colors are blue and white with a little red trim.

Voters passed a levy in 2002 to construct a new high school next to the original school, converting the old high school into a middle school.

The original high school was built in 1960 with 9th through 11th grades attending.  Prior to that the district high school students attended Northwest High School in Canal Fulton, Ohio or Washington High School in Massillon, Ohio.

Notable alumni
Ryan Travis, two-time consensus first-team NCAA Division II All-American (2009–2010) football player at West Liberty University ended his career with 285 receptions, the fifth-highest total in NCAA Division II history.

References

High schools in Stark County, Ohio
Public high schools in Ohio